Kabouters (meaning gnomes in English) were a Dutch anarchist group in the 1970s.

Provos, with Kabouters, spread an absurdist, "carnival anarchism" that used provocative tactics, humor, and direct action, to upend cultural norms.

See also

Luud Schimmelpennink
Witkar
Green politics
Orange Alternative

References

Further reading 

 
 

Anarchism in the Netherlands
Green political parties in the Netherlands
Anarchist movements
Political organisations based in the Netherlands
1970s in Amsterdam